Châteauponsac, also known locally as Château Lorraine,  is a commune in the Haute-Vienne department in the Nouvelle-Aquitaine region in western France.

Geography
The river Semme flows westward to the north of the commune, then forms part of the commune's northern border
And the river Gartempe flows to the south through an impressive ravine below the 12th century church heading toward Poitiers and joining with the river Vienne

Inhabitants are known as Châtelots.

Sights
Its twelfth-century church is dedicated to Saint Thyrsus.

Births
 Jean Baubérot (born on 26 July 1941), French  historian  and sociologist

See also
Communes of the Haute-Vienne department

References

External links
Châteauponsac at Art Roman 

Communes of Haute-Vienne
County of La Marche